Calera Capital is a private equity firm focused on investments in middle-market companies.  Founded in 1991, the firm is currently investing out of its fifth fund, Calera Capital Partners V, which was raised in 2017.  Calera Capital has offices in San Francisco and Boston.

Investment Criteria and Transaction Types
Calera Capital makes equity investments in operating companies with enterprise values up to $1 billion.  The firm seeks to deploy between $50 million and $250 million in each transaction.  Many of Calera Capital's investments have involved founder- or family-owned businesses, and the firm reports that existing shareholders have re-invested over $1.2 billion in transactions with Calera Capital.

The firm pursues several types of transactions, including:
Leveraged recapitalizations,
Corporate spin-offs,
Take-private transactions,
Investments to facilitate growth or acquisitions, and
Restructurings.

While Calera has made investments across a range of industries, it is primarily focused on two sectors:
Business Services (Technology Enabled, Logistics, Financial Services, Healthcare)
Specialty Industrials (Industrial Services, Specialty Distribution, Specialty Manufacturing, Energy Services & Equipment)

History
Calera Capital was founded in 1991 as a partnership between the investment professionals and the Fremont Group, a private investment company based in San Francisco.  Calera Capital's initial pool of funds was provided by the Fremont Group.  Calera Capital raised its first institutional fund, Fremont Partners II, in 1996 with a diverse group of investors.  Fremont Partners III was raised in 2001 further expanding the firm's investor base.

Prior to 2007, Calera Capital was known as Fremont Partners, a name the firm derived from the Fremont Group.  The name change to Calera Capital occurred as the firm began raising its fourth fund, Calera Capital Partners IV, and reflected the firm's transition to an entirely independent entity owned by the investment professionals and no longer affiliated with the Fremont Group.

Calera is currently investing out of its fifth fund, Calera Capital Partners V, a $555 million fund targeting investments in companies valued between $100 million and $750 million.

Current Portfolio Companies

Grandpoint
Transaction Services Group
United Dental Partners
Carnegie Fabrics
Evans Network of Companies
Arnott
ImageFIRST Healthcare Laundry Specialists
Bay State Physical Therapy
FitzMark

Prior Portfolio Companies
IPS Corporation 
Ironshore 
Rock-It Cargo 
Sterling Infosystems
LoopNet
Direct General
First Republic Bank
Kinetic Concepts
McCormick Packaging
Specialty Brands
Vantage Building Products
Juno Lighting
Kerr Group
Resun Leasing
Software Architects
Tapco International
Coldwell Banker
Crown Pacific
Petro Stopping Centers
Competitor Group Inc

References

External links

Financial services companies established in 1991
Private equity firms of the United States
American companies established in 1991
Companies based in San Francisco
1991 establishments in California